Ab Chendaran-e Sofla Gelal (also Romanized as Āb Chendārān-e Soflá Gelāl; also known as Āb Chendār, Āb Chendārān, and Āb Chendār-e Gelāl) is a village in Chin Rural District, Ludab District, Boyer-Ahmad County, Kohgiluyeh and Boyer-Ahmad Province, Iran. At the 2006 census, its population was 444, in 85 families.

References 

Populated places in Boyer-Ahmad County